The Tasmola culture was an early Iron Age culture during the Saka period (7th to 3rd centuries BCE) in central Kazakhstan.

Burials
Everything known about the Tasmola culture originates from the barrows (or kurgans) they built to bury their deceased. The necropoles involve mainly a large barrow and an adjoining small one.

Finds
Characteristic finds are bronze arrowheads, daggers and belt ornaments.
The bronze and golden wares show influences from the preceding Begazy-Dandybai culture.

Genetics

A genetic study published in Nature in May 2018 examined the remains of eight Sakas buried on the central steppe between ca. 900 BC and 500 BC, most of whom were ascribed to the Tasmola culture. The three samples of Y-DNA extracted belonged to the haplogroups R1 (two samples) and E. The eight samples of mtDNA extracted belonged to C4a1a, F1b1, A, H101, C4d, U2e, H10 and U7a4. The Sakas of the central steppe were determined to be of about 56% Western Steppe Herder ancestry and 44% southern Siberian hunter-gatherer ancestry. Hunter-gatherer ancestry was primarily paternal. They displayed a higher amount of southern Siberian hunter-gatherer admixture than other peoples of the Scythian cultures, including other Sakas. It was suggested that the Sakas of the central steppe were a major source of western Eurasian ancestry among the Xiongnu, and that the Huns emerged through the conquest of Sakas by the Xiongnu.

See also
Barrows of Tasmola
Begazy-Dandybai culture
Saka
History of Kazakhstan

References

Sources

External links
Tasmola culture in the Great Soviet Encyclopedia, 3rd Edition (1970-1979)
Barrows with stone ranges of the Tasmola culture - UNESCO World Heritage Centre
Megalithic mausolea of the Begazy-Dandybai culture - UNESCO World Heritage Centre

Archaeological cultures of Central Asia
Archaeology of Kazakhstan
Iranian archaeological cultures
Saka
Scytho-Siberian world